Daphne sureil is a shrub, of the family Thymelaeaceae.  It is native to China, specifically Xizang, and other regions in close proximity, including Bangladesh and Bhutan.

Description
The shrub is evergreen, and grows up to 2.5 m tall. Its grayish brown branches are arranged in an ascending fashion.  It is often found in tropical cloud forests at an altitude of 1800 to 2800 m.

References

sureil